Edwin McCain's The Austin Sessions was his fifth album overall, but the first released after his split with longtime label Lava Records. ATC Records issued this album, which was recorded at Arlin Studios in Austin, Texas and Seventeen Grand Studios in Nashville, Tennessee. Sessions is completely acoustic, with a mix of new material, "fan favorites", and selected covers that he often plays at live shows.

Track listing
 "Let It Slide" (Larry Chaney, Phillip Lamonds, McCain, Pete Riley) - 3:21
 "Go Be Young" (McCain) - 5:17
 "I Want It All" (McCain, Wendell Mobley, Neil Thrasher) - 4:08
 "Little Girls" (Chaney, Lamonds, McCain, Riley) - 3:51
 "Sorry to a Friend" (McCain) - 5:49
 "Popcorn Box" (Jeff Armstrong, Eric Hamilton) - 5:40
 "No Choice" (Buddy Mondlock) - 3:53
 "Ghosts of Jackson Square" (McCain) - 5:05
 "Island Song" (Bruce Crichton) - 4:06
 "Wino's Lullabye" (McCain) - 4:10
 "Romeo and Juliet" (Mark Knopfler) - 7:34
 "Beautiful Day" (McCain, Riley) - 3:30

Personnel
Edwin McCain - guitar (acoustic), vocals, producer
Pete Riley - guitar (acoustic), vocals (background), producer
Larry Chaney - guitar (acoustic), mandolin, guitar (electric), producer
Dave Harrison - percussion, drums, producer
Greg Archilla - producer, engineer, mixing
Scott Bannevich - bass, guitar (bass), producer
Steve Chadie - engineer
Justin Harris - art direction, design
Kevin Houston - mixing assistant, assistant
Craig Shields - saxophone, producer, wind controller
Hank Williams - mastering

Charts

References

2003 albums
Edwin McCain albums